Eila Peitsalo (1931–1997) was a Finnish film, television and stage actress.

Selected filmography
 It Began in the Rain (1953)
 After the Fall of Man (1953)
 Poika eli kesäänsä (Young Love) (1955)

References

Bibliography 
 Goble, Alan. The Complete Index to Literary Sources in Film. Walter de Gruyter, 1999.

External links 
 

1931 births
1997 deaths
Finnish stage actresses
Finnish film actresses
Finnish television actresses
People from Turku